Karl-Gustav von Alfthan (born 18 February 1945 in Helsinki) is a Finnish sprint canoer who competed in the late 1960s. At the 1968 Summer Olympics in Mexico City, he finished fifth in the K-4 1000 m event.

References
Sports-reference.com profile

1945 births
Living people
Sportspeople from Helsinki
Canoeists at the 1968 Summer Olympics
Finnish male canoeists
Olympic canoeists of Finland